The Battle of Cobleskill (also known as the Cobleskill massacre) was an American Revolutionary War raid on the frontier settlement of Cobleskill, New York on May 30, 1778.  The battle, having taken place in the modern-day hamlet of Warnerville, New York, near the modern (2019) Cobleskill-Richmondville High School, marked the beginning of a phase in which Loyalists and Iroquois, encouraged and supplied by British authorities in the Province of Quebec, raided and destroyed numerous villages on what was then the United States western frontier of New York and Pennsylvania.

A small party of Iroquois entered Cobleskill and drew the local defenders into a trap set by a much larger party of Iroquois and Loyalists under the command of Joseph Brant.  After killing a number of the militia and driving off the remainder, Brant's forces destroyed much of the settlement.  New York's defenders retaliated against Brant's actions against Cobleskill and other communities by destroying Iroquois villages later in the year, and Continental Army forces destroyed more Iroquois villages in the Sullivan Expedition of 1779.

Background

With the failure of British General John Burgoyne's campaign to the Hudson after the Battles of Saratoga in October 1777, the American Revolutionary War in upstate New York became a frontier war.  British leaders in the Province of Quebec supported Loyalist and Native American partisan fighters with supplies and armaments.  During the winter of 1777–78 Brant and other British-allied Indians developed plans to attack frontier settlements in New York and Pennsylvania.  In February 1778 Brant established a base of operations at Onaquaga (present-day Windsor, New York).  He recruited a mix of Iroquois and Loyalists estimated to number between two and three hundred by the time he began his campaign in May.  One of his objectives was to acquire provisions for his forces and those of John Butler, who was planning operations in the Susquehanna River valley.

In 1778 the settlement of Cobleskill, New York consisted of twenty families living on farms spread out along Cobleskill Creek.  It was part of the Schoharie Creek area which was a significant source of food for the Patriot war effort.  Its principal defense was the small local militia under Captain Christian Brown.  When attacks by the Iroquois were rumored to be coming in the spring of 1778, the militia appealed for additional defenses.  Continental Army Colonel Ichabod Alden sent a company of thirty to forty men from his 7th Massachusetts Regiment under Captain William Patrick to reinforce the militia.

Battle

On the morning of May 30 Brant laid a trap for Cobleskill's defenders.  He sent forward a small number of natives as a lure.  Captain Patrick's force and the local militia spotted them near the southern edge of the settlement.  Despite Captain Brown's warning that the Indians might be setting a trap, Patrick pressed forward as the natives withdrew, engaging them in a running battle.  After about one mile (1.6 km) Brant sprung his trap, and Patrick's company was engulfed by Brant's larger force.  Both Patrick and his second in command were killed in the battle, as was about half of their force.  Brown organized the remaining forces into a fighting retreat back into the settlement.  Five men took refuge in the house of George Warner which the attackers set on fire, killing all five men.  A total of 22 settlers were killed, eight were wounded, and five captured by Brant's men, while Brant's force suffered an estimated 25 casualties.

Aftermath
Brant and his men burned ten houses and associated outbuildings before withdrawing, killing any cattle they could not take.  Brant took five [seven] prisoners, [which the Indians prepared to burn at the stake as retribution for a previous group of captives effecting an escape from the Indians, killing several Indians to do so.  This group of seven prisoners were made to gather wood for their own funeral pryer, and the fire was actually lit, before one of the captives, Lt. Maynard, a freemason, gave the mason signal of distress.  Chief Brant noticed this, and stopped the execution.  All of the seven captives were then made to march 40 days, first to Montreal, then to Quebec, obtaining only the sustenance they were able to gather while on the forced march.  On the journey the Indians forced these seven captives to repeatedly "run the gauntlet" and forced them at times to keep their fingertips pushed into hot glowing pipe bowls for the Indians' amusement.  They were never given a choice of their future or lives by the Indians, or Chief Brant at any time.  At Quebec these seven were ransomed by the Iroquois to the British authorities, and were kept at Quebec as prisoners of war until the treaty of 1783.  The account of Lt. Maynard is related in "1000 Famous Freemasons" along with stories of an additional five masons, other revolutionary patriots, who were likewise saved by Brant.  The groups capture and journey is chronicled in "Forests and Clearings by BF Hubbard, Montreal, 1874 pp. 62–63-64.]  Brant continued to build his forces and raid frontier communities in the Mohawk valley.  He considered following up the attack on Cobleskill with one on Cherry Valley, but because the militia was on high alert, he instead withdrew back to Iroquois territory.  Cherry Valley was the scene of a massacre the following November by forces led in part by Brant.

New York Governor George Clinton, who had been considering operations against Onaquaga, enlarged those plans after the raid on Cobleskill and Brant's attack on German Flatts in September.  In October 1778 Continental and militia forces destroyed Onaquaga and Unadilla, another Indian village that supported Brant and Butler.

The settlers of Cobleskill who were rendered destitute by the action received £200 in compensation for their troubles.  Settlers from many area communities began withdrawing to larger, better fortified communities like Cherry Valley (which began construction of a fort after the raid) and Schenectady.  This action and later ones by Brant and Butler contributed to the decision by the Continental Congress to authorize a major Continental Army expedition into Iroquois territory.  Commanded by Generals John Sullivan and James Clinton, the 1779 expedition systematically destroyed the villages of Iroquois tribes fighting for the British, but did little to stop the frontier war.

Notes

References

External links
Three Rivers History
schohariehistory.net
6th (7th) Massachusetts Regiment

1778 in the United States
Cobleskill
Cobleskill
Cobleskill
Cobleskill
Cobleskill
Cobleskill
Schoharie County, New York
1778 in New York (state)
Cobleskill
Massacres in 1778